The men's high jump event at the 1967 European Indoor Games was held on 11 March in Prague.

Results

References

High jump at the European Athletics Indoor Championships
High